YouTube Vanced (or simply Vanced) is a discontinued, modified third-party YouTube application for Android with a built-in ad blocker. Other features of the app include SponsorBlock, background play, free picture-in-picture (PiP), an AMOLED black theme, swipe control for brightness and volume, and the ability to restore dislike counts on YouTube videos. A YouTube Music version of Vanced was also developed.

The name Vanced originates from the word advanced but with ad removed, in reference to the software's ad blocking features.

On March 13, 2022, the developers of YouTube Vanced announced that the application would be shut down after they received a cease and desist letter from Google, which forced the developers to stop developing and distributing the app. Although the app will continue to function for users who have already installed it, the app will likely stop working at some point in the future without any further updates.

Development 
The June 2021 update brought redesigned logo as well as fixing login and SponsorBlock bugs.

Features 
 YouTube Vanced blocks ads from YouTube and uses SponsorBlock to skip in-video sponsor segments
 The picture-in-picture mode allows watching videos in a floating window
 Background play allows playing video sound in background
 Forced HDR mode
 Forced VP9 codec
 Override max resolution
 Swipe control for brightness and volume
 Google login like the original YouTube app using MicroG
 Dislike counter re-added using the Return YouTube Dislike database

See also 
 youtube-dl
 Comparison of YouTube downloaders

References

External links 
 

YouTube
Android (operating system) software
Discontinued software